Aryann Bhowmik (born 1992) is a Bengali film actor who is best known for his work in the 2011 Bengali film Chalo Paltai. His acting has made a mark in the Tollywood arena. Apart from films, Aryann has also made appearances in television and shows. His collaboration with renowned Bengali actor Prosenjit Chatterjee brought him into the limelight. His earlier name was Devdaan, which he changed to Aryann in 2013.

Career
Bhowmik made his first appearance with the 2008 Bengali film, Neel Rajar Deshe, when he was in Class 8. In this film, he got a chance to work with actors Indrani Haldar and Ashish Vidyarthi. In an interview with The Times of India, he said that he got the chance to work in the film without an audition. According to him, director Riingo Banerjee had auditioned 20 to 22 kids for a character in the film, but he didn't like any of them. Singer Saptak Bhattacharjee, who is a close acquaintance of Aryann and who sang a number of songs for the film, showed Aryann's photo to Riingo in his mobile phone. On seeing his picture, Riingo immediately decided that the role should be assigned to Aryann. This incident marked Aryann's debut in the Bengali film industry. Later on, in 2011, Aryann made a grand appearance in the Bengali film Chalo Paltai by Haranath Chakraborty, where he played the role of Prosenjit Chatterjee's son. Aryann regards Chalo Paltai as his official entry into films. He is also the leading man of R. K. Gupta's upcoming directorial debut, Window Connection. Apart from doing films, Aryann also excels in Karate and dance.

Filmography

Films

References

Living people
Male actors in Bengali cinema
Indian male film actors
21st-century Indian male actors
Bengali male actors
1992 births
Male actors from Kolkata
Bengali male television actors